Fort Benton may refer to:

 Fort Benton (Patterson, Missouri), listed on the NRHP in Missouri
 Fort Benton, Montana, a town in Montana
 Fort Benton Historic District, a National Historic Landmark

See also
 Benton (disambiguation)
 Benton City (disambiguation)
 Benton Station (disambiguation)
 Bentonville (disambiguation)